Pierre Mignot (born February 23, 1944, in Montreal, Quebec) is a Canadian cinematographer. He is a four-time Canadian Film Award and Genie Award winner for Best Cinematography, winning at the 28th Canadian Film Awards in 1977 for J.A. Martin Photographer (J.A. Martin photographe), at the 5th Genie Awards in 1984 for Maria Chapdelaine, at the 6th Genie Awards in 1985 for Mario and at the 8th Genie Awards in 1987 for Anne Trister.

He was also nominated in 1980 for Cordélia, in 1983 for A Day in a Taxi (Une journée en taxi), in 1987 for Exit, in 1989 for Straight for the Heart (À corps perdu), in 1990 for Cruising Bar, in 1992 for Phantom Life (La vie fantôme), in 1999 for Alegría, in 2004 for Bittersweet Memories (Ma vie en cinémascope) and in 2005 for C.R.A.Z.Y..

References

External links

1944 births
Canadian cinematographers
People from Montreal
Best Cinematography Genie and Canadian Screen Award winners
Living people
Prix Albert-Tessier winners
Best Cinematography Jutra and Iris Award winners